Parvocellular can refer to:
 Parvocellular cell, located in the lateral geniculate nucleus
 Parvocellular pathway of the visual system
 Parvocellular neurosecretory cell
 Parvocellular red nucleus
 Parvocellular reticular nucleus